Suzhou North Railway Station is a station on Line 2 of Suzhou Rail Transit. The station is located in Xiangcheng District of Suzhou. It started service on December 28, 2013 with the opening of Line 2.

Bus connections
This station is connected to Suzhou North Railway Station bus stop, which is served by bus routes 8, 77, 80, 139, 711, 811, 819 and 866.

References

Railway stations in Jiangsu
Suzhou Rail Transit stations
Railway stations in China opened in 2013